Voluntarism may refer to:

 Doxastic voluntarism, the philosophical view that people choose their own beliefs.
 Voluntarism (action), any action based on non-coercion
 Voluntarism (philosophy), a perspective in metaphysics and the philosophy of mind that prioritizes the will over emotion or reason
 Voluntarism (psychology), the doctrine that the power of the will organizes the mind’s content into higher-level thought processes
 Voluntaryism, a libertarian ideology based on contractualism and the absence of initiatory force or coerced association by any person, state, or collective
 Voluntaryism (religion), the belief that religious institutions should be supported by voluntary contributions rather than government subsidy
 Volunteering, donating one's labor without monetary compensation

See also 

 Anarchism
 Agorism